Uniting for Consensus (UfC), nicknamed the Coffee Club, is a movement that developed in the 1990s in opposition to the possible expansion of permanent seats in the United Nations Security Council. Under the leadership of Italy, it aims to counter the bids for permanent seats proposed by G4 nations (Brazil, Germany, India, and Japan) and is calling for a consensus before any decision is reached on the form and size of the United Nation Security Council.

History
Italy, through the ambassador Francesco Paolo Fulci, along with Pakistan, Mexico and Egypt, founded the "Coffee Club" in 1995 . The four countries were united by a rejection of the proposal to increase the number of permanent members of the Security Council, instead desiring to encourage the expansion of non-permanent seats. The founders of the group were soon joined by other countries, including Spain, Argentina, Turkey, and Canada, and in a short time the group came to include about 50 countries in Asia, Africa, and Latin America. The thesis of the Uniting for Consensus group is that the increase of permanent seats would further accentuate the disparity between the member countries and result in the extension of a series of privileges with a cascade effect. The new permanent members would in fact benefit from the method of electing, which is particularly advantageous in a number of specific organs of the United Nations System.

During the 59th session of the United Nations General Assembly in 2005, the UfC group — led by the representatives of Canada, Italy, and Pakistan — made a proposal that centred on an enlargement of the number of non-permanent members from ten to twenty. The non-permanent members would be elected by the General Assembly for a two-year term and would be eligible for immediate re-election, subject to the decision of their respective geographical groups. The other members and co-sponsors of the text, entitled "Reform of the Security Council", were listed as Argentina,  Malta, Mexico, San Marino, Spain and Turkey. Although the proposal was not accepted, the initiative found broad consensus among member states, including permanent member China.

On 20 April 2009, Italy, acting as representatives of the UfC group, provided a new model of reform, which was presented as a concrete attempt to reach a deal. The document proposed creating a new category of seats, still non-permanent, but elected for an extended duration (3 to 5 years terms) without the possibility of immediate re-election. This new kind of seat would not be allocated to single national countries but rather to regional groups on a rotational basis. As far as traditional categories of seats are concerned, the UfC proposal does not imply any change, but only the introduction of small and medium size states among groups eligible for regular seats. This proposal includes even the question of veto, giving a range of options that goes from abolition to limitation of the application of the veto only to Chapter VII matters.

During the last round, Italy firmly rejected the G4 proposal as well as the African Union one and even denounced the unfair behaviour of G4 countries. According to Italy, the G4 is attempting to exclude the UfC proposal from the floor, “on the basis of a presumed level of support”. Moreover, Italy believes that it has shown flexibility by putting forward a new proposal in April 2009, while the G4 remained tied to its 2005 document. Italy's active role in current discussions started in February 2009 before the beginning of intergovernmental negotiations, when Minister of Foreign Affairs Franco Frattini hosted more than 75 countries to develop a shared path towards a reform of the Security Council. In May 2011, the members states which have participated in the group meeting held in Rome rose to 120.

Members
As of 19 February 2009, core members of the Uniting for Consensus group were:

*Whilst Spain is not an official member of the G20, it is a permanent invitee.

See also
Reform of the United Nations Security Council

References

External links

United Nations reform
Foreign relations of Italy
United Nations coalitions and unofficial groups